The Crêpe bretonne is a traditional dish in Lower Brittany, a region of France. It can be served plain, or filled with sweet or salty ingredients. The Crêpe bretonne can be made of wheat (sweet crêpe) or buckwheat (salted crêpe). This last is less well-known and should not be confused with the buckwheat pancake typical of Upper Brittany, which has a different recipe.

History 

The crêpe has been consumed for thousands of years everywhere in the world, constituting the basic food of a meal.

Historians claim that the crepe has existed since 7000 BC. The crepe was quite thick, made with a batter mixing water and various crushed cereals. It was a simple porridge spread and dried out which was prepared on a hot stone then on a metal plate, "bilig" in Breton, then cooked in the hearth of the fireplace. 

Buckwheat is originally from Asia. This flower was brought back from the crusades in the 12th century. From this period onwards, Traces of buckwheat pollen have been found in peatlands in Brittany. 

Nicknamed "the plant of a hundred days", this flower grows rapidly, requires constant humidity, acidic soil and a temperate climate.

Brittany is therefore perfectly suited to the cultivation of buckwheat.

The Duchess Anne of Brittany contributed to the rise of the crêpe bretonne at the beginning of the 16th century in a difficult period for the inhabitants of rural Brittany. 

It was the Dutch who introduced buckwheat to Brittany. 

At least once a week, crepes were made on a billig. The crepes were accompanied by local product, depending on the area, with sorrel leaf, sausage or salted butter. 

In the 20th century, the buckwheat culture was in trouble in Brittany and it almost disappeared. Nevertheless this tradition continued.

Production 

The local production of buckwheat is insufficient to supply the 15,000 tons usually consumed in France every year; half the production of buckwheat crêpes (and of buckwheat pancakes) is therefore dependent on imports of goods that come primarily from China, Poland or Canada. There is a label of protected origin for buckwheat flour from Brittany; the association Blé noir tradition Bretagne brings together over 800 producers, as well as some 10 millers, to promote the use of Breton flour (some 4,000 tons per year). In the mid-20th century, owing to the emigration of many Bretons, Breton crêperies started opening elsewhere in France, especially in Paris, in the Montparnasse district, and in other countries around the world.

Making 

Traditionally, the batter is cooked in a specific device called billig in Breton, galetiere in the local French dialect (galettoire or tuile in Upper Brittany). 

The billig is a typically Breton circular cast iron cooking plate

Crêpes based on the Breton recipes are usually made with a simple crêpière (or frying pan).

The batter requires energy to aerate the dough and precise gestures to spread it on the billig. The  or the scraper must be held with flexibility and the spatula must permit easily turning the cake without breaking it.

Contrary to its cousin the galette, the crêpe bretonne must be quite thin and crispy!

Wheat and buckwheat versions 
For those among the Bretons very much attached much to the traditions of Brittany, the krampouezhenn (plural: krampouezh) can refer either to the salty preparation with buckwheat flour, or the sweet version made from wheat. There are two traditional crepes of Lower Brittany:
 One based on wheat flour ( in Breton). The traditional batter is made of eggs, flour, sugar and milk, and is usually eaten sweetened.
 One based on buckwheat flour. The traditional batter is made of buckwheat flour, mixed with a maximum of 30% of wheat flour, water and salt (some people add eggs or milk); it is usually eaten salted.

Crêpe bretonne or Galette 

Warning: Do not confuse Galettes and Crêpe Bretonne 

The galette prevails in Upper Brittany (Ille-et-Vilaine, Loire-Atlantique, eastern parts of Morbihan and Côtes-d'Amor)

The crêpe bretonne prevails in Lower Brittany (Finistère, part of Morbihan and Côtes-d’Armor)

The Breton and geographer Mikael Bodlore-Penlaez has materialized this border in a map (in pink "crêpes", in light green "galettes")

Recipe Crêpe bretonne (buckwheat) 
Ingredients:

300 g buckwheat flour

2 tablespoons of wheat flour

1 teaspoon of salt

1 egg

1 level tablespoon of honey, if possible buckwheat flower honey / or 2 level tablespoon of sugar

200 ml of milk

300 + 100 ml water

Preparation: 

4 to 6 hours before cooking: In a bowl, mix 300 g of buckwheat flour, 2 tablespoons of wheat flour, 1 teaspoon of salt.

Add 300 ml of water. Beat vigorously for several minutes with a wooden spoon or spatula.

Cover the container with a clean cloth and let it rest in a temperate room.

30 min before cooking: Add 1 level tablespoon of honey and 1 egg to the mixture. Beat.

Add 200 ml of milk and 100 ml of water.

Mix.

Observation & tips 

 Buckwheat flour does not have a very long shelf life like wheat flour. Fresh flour should be used as much as possible to avoid any sour taste. If possible, use a Buckwheat flour from organic farming.
 It is important to mix the two flours and not see any trace of the wheat in the batter.
 Buckwheat does not allow the dough to rise (no gluten), unlike wheat.
 For a more fermented batter (containing wheat), add the honey/sugar at the first stage.
 For a more crispy and gold crêpe, add an egg in the receipt. it reduces also the batter's adhesion to the pan/billig
 For a more fluffy and colored crêpe, use milk only. 
 Milk is optional. It adds fluffiness and color.
 Ensure the pan/billig is very hot before cooking the first crêpe!
 A buckwheat pancake does not turn over.
 Finishing buttering after folding is optional, but recommended.

See also
 Federation de la crêperie 
 List of buckwheat dishes

References

Pancakes
French desserts
Buckwheat dishes